Ruatoria is a town in the Waiapu Valley of the Gisborne Region in the northeastern corner of New Zealand's North Island. The town was originally known as Cross Roads then Manutahi and was later named Ruatorea in 1913, after the Māori Master female grower Tōrea who had some of the finest storage pits in her Iwi at the time  (Te-Rua-a-Tōrea). In 1925 the name was altered  to "Ruatoria", although some texts retain the original spelling.

Ruatoria's Whakarua Park is the home of the East Coast Rugby Football Union.

Demographics
It is part of the wider Ruatoria-Raukumara statistical area.

Ruatoria had a population of 759 at the 2018 New Zealand census, an increase of 36 people (5.0%) since the 2013 census, and an increase of 36 people (5.0%) since the 2006 census. There were 225 households, comprising 396 males and 363 females, giving a sex ratio of 1.09 males per female, with 243 people (32.0%) aged under 15 years, 165 (21.7%) aged 15 to 29, 282 (37.2%) aged 30 to 64, and 66 (8.7%) aged 65 or older.

Ethnicities were 20.6% European/Pākehā, 95.3% Māori, 3.6% Pacific peoples, 2.4% Asian, and 0.8% other ethnicities. People may identify with more than one ethnicity.

Although some people chose not to answer the census's question about religious affiliation, 38.7% had no religion, 36.8% were Christian, 5.1% had Māori religious beliefs and 2.8% had other religions.

Of those at least 15 years old, 54 (10.5%) people had a bachelor's or higher degree, and 135 (26.2%) people had no formal qualifications. 27 people (5.2%) earned over $70,000 compared to 17.2% nationally. The employment status of those at least 15 was that 168 (32.6%) people were employed full-time, 90 (17.4%) were part-time, and 42 (8.1%) were unemployed.

Ruatoria-Raukumara statistical area

Ruatoria-Raukumara had a population of 1,233 at the 2018 New Zealand census, an increase of 30 people (2.5%) since the 2013 census, and a decrease of 54 people (−4.2%) since the 2006 census. There were 405 households, comprising 666 males and 567 females, giving a sex ratio of 1.17 males per female. The median age was 32.8 years (compared with 37.4 years nationally), with 336 people (27.3%) aged under 15 years, 243 (19.7%) aged 15 to 29, 498 (40.4%) aged 30 to 64, and 156 (12.7%) aged 65 or older.

Ethnicities were 22.4% European/Pākehā, 94.2% Māori, 2.9% Pacific peoples, 1.2% Asian, and 0.7% other ethnicities. People may identify with more than one ethnicity.

The percentage of people born overseas was 2.4, compared with 27.1% nationally.

Although some people chose not to answer the census's question about religious affiliation, 36.3% had no religion, 38.9% were Christian, 5.1% had Māori religious beliefs and 2.7% had other religions.

Of those at least 15 years old, 93 (10.4%) people had a bachelor's or higher degree, and 228 (25.4%) people had no formal qualifications. The median income was $19,400, compared with $31,800 nationally. 42 people (4.7%) earned over $70,000 compared to 17.2% nationally. The employment status of those at least 15 was that 315 (35.1%) people were employed full-time, 132 (14.7%) were part-time, and 78 (8.7%) were unemployed.

Geography
It is at the bottom of the Waiapu Valley on the banks of the Waiapu River just downstream of where the river is formed by the joining of the Mata and Tapuaeroa Rivers.

Climate
Precipitation is prodigiously high — the annual average precipitation total approaches . Precipitation is heavy all year-round, yet is particularly prodigious in the austral winter months from May to September. On 7 February 1973, Ruatoria had the highest ever air temperature recorded in the North Island, the same day the nation's highest temperature was recorded in the South Island town of Rangiora.

Industry
The principal industries in the district are related to agriculture and forestry. Attempts to sink oil wells in the area in the 1920s proved unprofitable.

History

The original shop, bunk house and cook house in the township of Tuparoa were destroyed by fire on two occasions between 1907 and 1913. Commerce was moved inland 5 miles to the area known as The Crossroads, northeast of the present town sitting on the area of the first river plain where it drops to the present river plain where the roads went north–south and to the east. (There was a race course on land alongside the Waiapu River below The Crossroads but that was abandoned by the end of the second world war). The Crossroads  too was destroyed by fire during the first world war and in 1920 the first general store and accommodation was erected by William Hayes Owen Johnston (1890-1960) on what is now Tuparoa Road. (The shop has been dismantled after his death in 1960) He is buried with his  third wife in the cemetery at Mahora on the Tuparoa road just before the junction with the side road to Reparoa. (His first and second wives were of the Gerrard family of Tuparoa and are buried in the cemetery at the top of the hill on the northern side of the creek which separated the old Tuparoa settlement).

From about 1925 onwards, Ruatoria began to replace Tuparoa as the main urban centre of the East Coast district of New Zealand. The transition to Ruatoria from Tuparoa was brought about by the increased reliability of State Highway 35, which at that time ran via the main street of Ruatoria. Tuparoa was disadvantaged by unreliable road access and a lack of all weather harbour.

The Rotokautuku Bridge, connecting Ruatoria to the northern side of Waiapu River, was built in 1964. This 1964 bridge replaced the old bridge which had been built in the 1930s. The old piles were used for the new bridge, although they had to be lowered by a metre to accommodate the new bridge.

In the 1980s, Ruatoria was briefly notorious for an outbreak of arson attacks in the town, during a period of severe economic downturn.

Significance to Māori
The Ngāti Porou proverb of identity relates to the area — Ko Hikurangi te maunga, ko Waiapu te awa, ko Ngāti Porou te iwi (Hikurangi is the mountain, Waiapu is the river, Ngāti Porou is the tribe). Ruatoria is within the iwi's rohe, and Te Runanganui o Ngāti Porou has offices located in the town.

The Waiapu River is of immense cultural, spiritual, economic, and traditional value to local Māori. According to traditional beliefs, a number of taniwha dwell in and protect the river, in turn protecting the valley and its hapū. Taniwha believed to be in Waiapu River include Kotuwainuku, Kotuwairangi, Ohinewaiapu, and Ngungurutehorowhatu.

According to an affidavit of Hapukuniha Te Huakore Karaka, two taniwha were placed in strategic locations in the river to protect the hapū from invading tribes — one near Paoaruku (a locality at ), and one at the Wairoa River (a small creek at ). Karaka said that a bridge was built from Tikitiki to Waiomatatini, to the protest of local Māori who were concerned that it would disturb the taniwha. The night before the bridge was completed, a storm came washing the bridge away — the weather till then had been calm. From then, one person would drown in the river nearly every year. If it did not happen one year, two would drown the next. A local tohunga, George Gage (Hori Te Kou-o-rehua Keeti) was approached to help the situation, and after that there were no similar drownings.

Marae

Ruatoria has several marae belonging to Ngāti Porou hapū:
 Hiruharama Marae and Kapohanga a Rangi meeting house, a meeting place of Te Aitanga a Mate and Te Aowera.
 Te Aowera Marae and Te Poho o Te Aowera meeting house, a meeting place of Te Aowera.
 Te Horo Marae and Rākaitemania meeting house, a meeting place of Ngāti Horowai, Te Whānau a Mahaki and Te Whānau a Uruhonea.
 Kakariki Marae and Rakaihoea meeting house, a meeting place of Te Whānau a Rākaihoea.
 Kariaka Marae and Ngāti Porou meeting house, a meeting place of Ngāi Tangihaere and Te Whānau a Hinekehu.
 Mangahanea Marae and Hinetapora meeting house, a meeting place of Ngāti Uepōhatu and Te Whānau a Hinetapora.
 Mangarua or Te Heapera Marae and Te Poho o Mangarua meeting house, a meeting place of Te Whānau a Hinetapora.
 Porourangi or Waiomatatini Marae and Porourangi meeting house, a meeting place of Te Whānau a Karuai.
 Reporua Marae and Tū Auau meeting house, a meeting place of Ngāti Rangi.
 Ruataupare Marae and meeting house, a meeting place of Ngāi Tangihaere.
 Rauru or Taumata o Mihi Marae and Rauru Nui a Toi meeting house, a meeting place of Te Whānau a Hinekehu.
 Uepohatu Marae and meeting house, a meeting place of Ngāti Uepōhatu.
 Umuariki Marae and meeting house, a meeting place of Ngāti Uepōhatu and Te Whānau a Umuariki.

In October 2020, the Government committed $5,756,639 from the Provincial Growth Fund to upgrade 29 Ngāti Porou marae, including Te Aowera Marae, Te Horo, Kariaka, Rauru, Umariki, Mangahanea, Mangarua, Reporua and Ruataupare Marae. It also committed $273,890 to upgrade Uepohatu Marae and $232,227 to upgrade Hiruharama Marae.

Education

Ngata Memorial College is a Year 1–13 co-educational public school with a roll of  students as of  The college opened in 1959.

Te Kura Kaupapa Māori o Te Waiu O Ngati Porou is a Year 1–13 co-educational public school  with a roll of  students as of

Notable residents

The area was home to politician Sir Āpirana Ngata, and Te Moananui-a-Kiwa Ngārimu — the second of three Māori to receive a Victoria Cross.

See also 
 Waiapu Valley
 Waiapu River
 Gisborne Region

References

External links 
 Photos of Ruatoria on Panoramio

Populated places in the Gisborne District